Gary Anthony Taylor, born in Los Angeles, California, is an American singer, songwriter, multi-instrumentalist, and producer.

His songs have been recorded by a number of leading artists, including by Grover Washington, Jr. ("Keep in Touch"), Anita Baker ("Good Love"), Walter Beasley, Lonnie Liston Smith, George Clinton & P-Funk Allstars, Vanessa Rubin ("Living Without a Heart"), and The Whispers ("Just Gets Better with Time," "My Heart Your Heart").

As a background vocalist, Taylor appeared on The Whispers' R&B #1 "Rock Steady," and "My Flame" for Vanessa Williams, as well as with Nancy Wilson.

As a songwriter and producer, Mr. Taylor has worked with both veteran acts, such as Anita Baker ("Good Love") and The Whispers ("Just Gets Better With Time," "My Heart, Your Heart"), and a new wave of soul artists such as Lalah Hathaway ("I'm Coming Back") among them.

Taylor is also the cousin of songwriter and producer Skip Scarborough. Taylor covered the Scarborough-penned single for The Emotions, "Don't Ask My Neighbors" on his 1988 album, Compassion.

Discography

Shelved/unreleased albums
Just Gets Better with Time (1985); A&M Records

Songwriting

References 

Living people
Musicians from Los Angeles
Year of birth missing (living people)
African-American male singer-songwriters
African-American record producers
Record producers from California
Singer-songwriters from California
21st-century African-American male singers
20th-century African-American male singers